Bazaruto Island Airport  is an airport serving Bazaruto Island, Bazaruto Archipelago, Mozambique, and the Bazaruto National Park.

See also

List of airports in Mozambique

References

Google Earth
OpenMaps maps
 Mozambique National Parks

External links
Aeroportos de Moçambique

Bazaruto Archipelago
Airports in Mozambique
Buildings and structures in Inhambane Province